Graphium policenes, the common swordtail or small striped swordtail, is a species of butterfly in the family Papilionidae (swallowtails). It is found in tropical Africa.

The wingspan is 55–60 mm in males and 60–65 mm in females. The species has continuous broods during warmer months.

The larvae feed on Uvaria caffra, Artabotrys monteiroae, Uvaria bukobensis, Uvara chamae, Landolphia buchannani, Landolphia ugandensis, Polyalthia species, Annona reticulata, Annona senegalensis, Annona squamosa, and Monanthotaxis caffra.

Subspecies
Graphium policenes policenes (Sub-Saharan Africa)
Graphium policenes telloi Hecq, 1999 (Nigeria, northern Cameroon, Central African Republic, southern Sudan)

Gallery

Similar species
It is very similar to Graphium policenoides and  Graphium liponesco 
It is the nominal member of the policenes -clade (policenes, Graphium liponesco, Graphium biokoensis, Graphium policenoides, Graphium porthaon.)

Taxonomy
Aurivillius in Seitz places policenes (policenoides), nigrescens ,sisenna (polistratus), polistratus, junodi, porthaon and collona in the Policenes Group Subgroup 2 circumscribed Hindwing with a long, narrow tail of uniform width at vein 4. Frons black with white lateral margins. Wings above with green or greenish white markings. Cell of the forewing with 5 — 6 transverse bands or spots. Both wings with submarginal spots. Hindwing beneath with a so-called ornamental band, formed of red spots. Besides the markings already mentioned the forewing has a spot at the base of cellules 1 a and 1 b, an oblique transverse streak in the basal part of these cellules and 8 discal spots, one each in cellules 1 a — 6 and 8; the hindwing has a narrow transverse band at the base, a narrow median band which consists only of three spots (in the cell and in cellules 2 and 7) and usually also 7 discal spots in cellules 1 c -7, of 'which, however, that in 1 c is red. The larva has four pairs of spines, one pair each on the 1., 2., 3. and penultimate segments. The 
pupa is very angularly widened at the beginning of the abdomen and has a long hump on the mesothorax. 
Subgroup 2.The apical fourth of the cell of the hindwing above unicolorous black without light spot. The cell of the forewing with a light spot or dot at the costal margin close before the apex.

References

Carcasson, R.H. 1960 The Swallowtail Butterflies of East Africa (Lepidoptera, Papilionidae). Journal of the East Africa Natural History Society pdf Key to East Africa members of the species group, diagnostic and other notes and figures. (Permission to host granted by The East Africa Natural History Society)

policenes
Butterflies of Africa
Butterflies described in 1775
Taxa named by Pieter Cramer